Orientoreicheia is a genus of beetles in the family Carabidae, containing the following species:

 Orientoreicheia bodenheimeri Bulirsch, 1997
 Orientoreicheia caucasica (A. Fleischer, 1921)
 Orientoreicheia multisetosa Balkenohl & Brunne, 2004

References

Scaritinae